Julie E. Cram (born January 23, 1965) is a Deputy Assistant Administrator for Economic Growth, Education and Environment (E3) at the United States Agency for International Development. She is a former lobbyist for DDR Advocacy and a Republican Party operative who worked for former U.S. President George W. Bush.

Career
George W. Bush appointed Cram to the position of "Director of Public Affairs, International Trade Commission" in 2003. She worked for the Bush-Cheney '04 campaign as the Deputy Communications Director for National Surrogate Media, with the Republican National Committee as the Director of Communications for Victory 2004, and as Director of Surrogate Media Operations for the Republican National Convention. She was named Deputy Assistant to the President and Director of Public Liaison in March 2007.

Cram has also served as Vice President of Corporate Communications at TerreStar Networks Inc., Director of Public Affairs at Burson-Marsteller, and Director of Public Affairs of the International Trade Administration at the Department of Commerce.

In 2013, Cram was a signatory to an amicus curiae brief submitted to the Supreme Court in support of same-sex marriage during the Hollingsworth v. Perry case.

References

1965 births
Living people
American University alumni
New York (state) Republicans
George W. Bush administration personnel
Trump administration personnel
People of the United States Agency for International Development